The Parallax View is a 1974 American political thriller film produced and directed by Alan J. Pakula, and starring Warren Beatty, Hume Cronyn, William Daniels and Paula Prentiss. The screenplay by David Giler and Lorenzo Semple Jr. was based on the 1970 novel by Loren Singer. The story concerns a reporter's investigation into a secretive organization, the Parallax Corporation, whose primary focus is political assassination.

Plot
In Seattle's Space Needle, TV journalist Lee Carter witnesses the assassination of presidential candidate Charles Carroll. The investigation of a congressional investigative committee attributes the assault to one suspect, who was killed in the aftermath. 

Three years later, Carter visits ex-boyfriend Joe Frady, an investigative newspaper reporter. She tells him six witnesses to the killing have since died and she fears she will be next. Soon after, Carter is found dead of a drug overdose. Guilty over disregarding Carter's pleas, Frady visits the small town of Salmontail to probe the drowning death of Judge Arthur Bridges, another witness to Carroll's assassination. The local Sheriff, Wicker, offers Frady his assistance and escorts him to a huge dam where Bridges met his fate. As the dam's floodgates open, Wicker pulls his gun on Frady. After a scuffle, Frady escapes the dam site and commandeers Wicker's squad car to the sheriff's house, where he uncovers documents from the Parallax Corporation, an organization recruiting "security" operatives. Later, Frady contacts a local psychology professor who assesses a Parallax personality test taken from Wicker's desk. He deems it a profiling exam to identify psychopaths.

Austin Tucker, who was an aide to Carroll, agrees to meet Frady. Aboard his sailboat, Tucker reveals there have been two attempts on his life since Carroll's assassination. Shortly after, a bomb goes off, killing everyone on board but Frady, who swims ashore to contact his editor. He tells him he wants the public to believe he died in the explosion so he can apply to Parallax under an alias. Days later, Jack Younger, a Parallax official, contacts Frady to tell him Parallax has accepted him for training. On his first visit to the Corporation's Los Angeles headquarters, his pulmonary reactions are measured as he watches a montage of still pictures that juxtapose pro- and anti-American attitudes. After departing the offices, Frady trails a Parallax operative to Los Angeles International Airport, where he arranges the planting of a bomb aboard a passenger jet. Frady boards the plane, spotting an ambitious senator who, like the ill-fated Carroll, now considers running for president. After the jet's take-off, Frady secretly scribbles on a napkin that there is a bomb aboard. He slips it onto a drink service cart, where a stewardess discovers it. The jet returns to Los Angeles, debarking passengers safely before the bomb explodes. 

Back at his apartment, Frady is confronted by Younger about his fake alibi but Frady manages to mollify Younger with yet another false identity. Later, at the newspaper office, Frady's editor listens to a recording of the conversation between Frady and Younger. He then places it in an envelope with other recordings. That same evening, he is poisoned by the plane's saboteur and the recordings vanish. Frady returns to Parallax headquarters and enters an auditorium in time to view a dress rehearsal of a political rally for another presidential aspirant, Senator George Hammond. Frady hides in the arena's catwalks, as Hammond drives a golf cart across the auditorium floor. At the end of the rehearsal, an unseen sniper fatally shoots Hammond, causing pandemonium. Frady realizes too late he has been set up as a scapegoat. He attempts to flee but is killed. Six months later, a congressional investigative committee reports that Frady, a paranoid acting alone, killed Hammond out of a sense of misguided patriotism.

Cast

Production

Development
The film is based on a novel by Loren Singer. While the novel followed witnesses of John F. Kennedy's assassination who were killed, the screenplay shifted the victim to a fictional politician closely resembling Robert F. Kennedy. Robert Towne did an uncredited rewrite on the screenplay.

Cinematography
Frady is often filmed from great distances, suggesting that he is being watched.

Montage
Most of the images used in the assassin training montage were of anonymous figures or important historical figures, featuring among others Richard Nixon, Adolf Hitler, Pope John XXIII, and Lee Harvey Oswald (in the picture taken moments after his shooting). The montage also uses a drawing by Jack Kirby of the Marvel Comics character Thor. It juxtaposes the concepts of LOVE, MOTHER, FATHER, HOME, ENEMY, and ME. The montage "captures the confusion of post-Kennedy America" by demonstrating the decay of values and longstanding traditions.

It has been compared to the brainwashing scene in the 1971 Stanley Kubrick film A Clockwork Orange.

Critical reception
At the time of its release, The Parallax View received mixed reactions from critics. Roger Ebert gave the film three out of four stars. While Beatty offered a good performance Ebert said the actor was not called upon to exercise his full talents, and Ebert also noted similarities to the 1973 film Executive Action, but said Parallax was "a better use of similar material, however, because it tries to entertain instead of staying behind to argue." In his review for The New York Times, Vincent Canby wrote, "Neither Mr. Pakula nor his screenwriters, David Giler and Lorenzo Semple, Jr., display the wit that Alfred Hitchcock might have used to give the tale importance transcending immediate plausibility. The moviemakers have, instead, treated their central idea so soberly that they sabotage credulity." Joseph Kanon of The Atlantic found the film's subject pertinent: "what gives the movie its real force is the way its menace keeps absorbing material from contemporary life."

Time magazine's Richard Schickel wrote, "We would probably be better off rethinking—or better yet, not thinking about—the whole dismal business, if only to put an end to ugly and dramatically unsatisfying products like The Parallax View."

In 2006, Entertainment Weekly critic Chris Nashawaty wrote, "The Parallax View is a mother of a thriller... and Beatty, always an underrated actor thanks (or no thanks) to his off-screen rep as a Hollywood lothario, gives a hell of a performance in a career that's been full of them."

The motion picture won the Critics Award at the Avoriaz Film Festival (France) and was nominated for the Edgar Allan Poe Award for Best Motion Picture. Gordon Willis won the Award for Best Cinematography from the National Society of Film Critics (USA).

The film's reception has been more positive in recent years. On Rotten Tomatoes the film has an approval rating of 88% based on reviews from 40 critics. The site's consensus states "The Parallax View blends deft direction from Alan J. Pakula and a charismatic Warren Beatty performance to create a paranoid political thriller that stands with the genre's best." On Metacritic the film has a score of 65% based on reviews from 12 critics.

Reviewing films depicting political assassination conspiracies for The Guardian, director Alex Cox labelled the film the "best JFK conspiracy movie". Film critic Matt Zoller Seitz has called the film, "a damn near perfect movie".

See also
 List of American films of 1974
 Assassinations in fiction
 List of films featuring surveillance
 The Manchurian Candidate
 Arlington Road
 Permindex

References

External links

 
 
 DVD Savant review of the montage
The Parallax View: Dark Towers an essay by Nathan Heller at the Criterion Collection

1974 films
1970s political thriller films
1970s psychological thriller films
American political thriller films
Films directed by Alan J. Pakula
Films about assassinations
Films about conspiracy theories
Paramount Pictures films
Films set in Seattle
Films set in Los Angeles
Films about journalists
Films based on American novels
Films with screenplays by Robert Towne
Films with screenplays by Lorenzo Semple Jr.
Films scored by Michael Small
American neo-noir films
1970s English-language films
1970s American films